Khoda Afarin Dam (also spelled as Khodaafarin Dam or Khudafarin Dam) is an earth-fill embankment dam on the Aras River straddling the international border between Iran and Azerbaijan. Armenian de facto protectorate Republic of Artsakh occupied the area in 1993, during the First Nagorno-Karabakh War, but on 18 October 2020, the Azerbaijani forces retook control of the dam during 2020 Nagorno-Karabakh conflict.

The purpose of the dam is hydroelectric power generation and irrigation. It was conceived as a joint project with the Soviet Union and both sides reached an agreement in October 1977. Designs were finalized in 1982, revised in the early 1990s and construction began in 1999.

The dam was complete and began to impound water in 2008. It was inaugurated in 2010. The irrigation works are still underway. During construction, several Bronze Age sites were discovered, including the grave of a Saka-Scythian warrior. The reservoir filling, or impoundment, was delayed in 2008 to accommodate excavations.

See also

 List of power stations in Azerbaijan
 List of power stations in Iran

References

Dams completed in 2008
Energy infrastructure completed in 2008
Hydroelectric power stations in Iran
Dams in East Azerbaijan Province
Dams in Azerbaijan
Hydroelectric power stations in Azerbaijan
Earth-filled dams
Iran–Soviet Union relations
Azerbaijan–Iran relations
2008 establishments in Azerbaijan
2008 establishments in Iran